John Rogers (January 11, 1630 – July 12, 1684) was an English Puritan minister and academic in early Colonial America.

Biography
Eldest son of minister Nathaniel Rogers, he was born in Coggeshall, a small town in Essex, and immigrated to New England with his family in 1636.  In 1649, at age 19, in the recent settlement of Cambridge (known as Newe Towne until 1638), he earned a B.A. from Harvard College which, only seven years earlier, in 1642, had graduated its first class of students.  In 1652, following an additional three years of study, he received an M.A. and, in 1660, married Elizabeth Denison of Ipswich.

Residing in Ipswich and, despite neither having been ordained as a minister or trained as a physician, Rogers practiced medicine and assisted in the ministry of his brother-in-law, local historian William Hubbard, whose service as Ipswich pastor ultimately extended for more than 50 years.  In 1682, Rogers was appointed President of Harvard, after the death of Urian Oakes. Not the first choice as successor by the Governing Board of Harvard, first choice Cotton Mather could not be released from his pastoral obligations, a second choice declined. John Rogers would be the one to accept the position. Described by Puritan minister and prolific author Cotton Mather, John Rogers was "sweet-tempered...genuinely pious and a accomplished gentleman given to long winded daily prayers." American historian Samuel Eliot Morison says that John Rogers would have "made a successful president", but having held the position for only two years, he died suddenly at the age of 54. He was buried at Old Burying Ground.

References

 Harvard History of the President's Office

1630 births
1684 deaths
Presidents of Harvard University
Harvard College alumni
People from Coggeshall